is the 23rd single by Japanese idol duo Wink. Written by Yasushi Akimoto and Masamichi Sugi, the single was released on March 1, 1995, by Polystar Records.

Background and release 
"Watashitachi Rashii Rule" was used as the theme song of the TV Asahi drama series .

"Watashitachi Rashii Rule" peaked at No. 46 on the Oricon's weekly charts and sold over 16,000 copies.

Track listing 
All music is arranged by Satoshi Kadokura.

Chart positions 
Weekly charts

Year-end charts

References

External links 
 
 

1995 singles
1995 songs
Wink (duo) songs
Japanese-language songs
Songs with lyrics by Yasushi Akimoto